Gong Qiule (born 27 July 1999) is a Chinese footballer currently playing as a full-back for Kunshan.

Club career
Gong Qiule was promoted to the senior team of Hebei China Fortune within the 2019 Chinese Super League season and would make his debut in a league game on 20 October 2019 against Jiangsu Suning F.C. in a 4-1 defeat. Initially starting as a forward he would go on to score his first goal for the club on his second appearance on 1 December 2019 against Wuhan Zall in a 2-1 victory. He would go on to be loaned out to third tier club Wuhan Three Towns for the 2020 China League Two campaign where he would aid them in winning the division title and promotion into the second tier.

On 28 April 2022, Gong would join second tier second tier club Kunshan on a free transfer. He would make his debut in a league game on 18 June 2022 against Qingdao Hainiu in a 1-0 victory, where he played as a full-back. He would go on to establish himself as regular within the team that won the division and promotion to the top tier at the end of the 2022 China League One campaign.

Career statistics

.

Honours

Club
Wuhan Three Towns
China League Two: 2020

Kunshan
China League One: 2022

References

External links

1999 births
Living people
Chinese footballers
China youth international footballers
Association football defenders
Chinese Super League players
China League Two players
Hebei F.C. players